Oak Square School is a historic school building at 35 Nonantum Street in Brighton, Massachusetts, a neighborhood of Boston, Massachusetts.

The school was designed by Edmund March Wheelwright, who designed a wide variety of Boston landmark buildings. It was built in 1894 on the site of Breck Gardens and had a major addition in 1923. When it closed in 1981, it was the last wood schoolhouse in Boston.  It was converted to housing in 1984.

It was designated a Boston Landmark by the Boston Landmarks Commission in 1979 and added to the National Register of Historic Places in 1980.

See also
National Register of Historic Places listings in southern Boston, Massachusetts

References

External links
City of Boston, Boston Landmarks CommissionOak Square School Study Report

School buildings on the National Register of Historic Places in Massachusetts
Schools in Boston
National Register of Historic Places in Boston
Landmarks in Brighton, Boston